Arsenios Autoreianos (Latinized as Arsenius Autorianus), ( 30 September 1273), Ecumenical Patriarch of Constantinople, lived about the middle of the 13th century.

Born in Constantinople c. 1200, Arsenios received his education in Nicaea at a monastery of which he later became the abbot, though not in orders. Subsequently, he gave himself up to a life of solitary asceticism in a Bithynian monastery, and is said to have remained some time in a monastery on Mount Athos.

Overview 
From this seclusion he was called by the Byzantine Emperor Theodore II Lascaris to the position of patriarch at Nicaea in 1255. Upon the emperor's death Arsenios may have shared guardianship of his son John IV Lascaris with George Muzalon: while the later historians Nikephoros Gregoras and Makarios Melissenos say the Patriarch was so named, the contemporary historians Pachymeres and Acropolites name only Mouzalon. Nevertheless, a few days after Theodore's death George Muzalon was murdered by Michael Palaiologos, and who, at an assembly of the aristocracy presided over by Patriarch Arsenios, was appointed regent for the boy. Arsenios also performed the double coronation of Michael Palaiologos and John Lascaris in January 1259.

Through the time between the death of Mouzalon and the double coronation, Arsenios had worked to protect the rights of the young emperor John Lascaris, at one point insisting that John and Michael exchange mutual oaths of loyalty. He also insisted that at the double coronation John Lascaris should be crowned first, which Michael Palaiologos saw as a serious barrier to his final usurpation. Pressure was put upon the patriarch to allow Palaiologos to be crowned alone, and even the young emperor was threatened. The patriarch found no support from the bishops assembled: except for two prelates, all believed that Palaiologos had the right to be crowned first. Arsenios at last conceded the point and crowned Michael and his wife first, while John Lascaris received only a special head-dress.

The ceremony completed, Arsenios took refuge in the monastery of Paschasius, retaining his office of patriarch but refusing to discharge its duties. Nicephorus of Ephesus was appointed in his stead. Michael Palaiologos, having recovered Constantinople from the Latin Empire, induced Arsenios to undertake the office of patriarch, but soon incurred Arsenios' severe censure by ordering the young prince John to be blinded. Arsenios went so far as to excommunicate Emperor Michael Palaiologos; after attempting to frighten the patriarch into rescinding the excommunication by threatening to appeal to the Pope, Michael at last convened a synod, had Arsenios deposed, and towards the end of May 1265 sent him into exile. There he died some years afterwards (according to Fabricius in 1264; others say in 1273).

Throughout these years Arsenios declined to lift the sentence of excommunication from Michael and after his death, when the new patriarch Joseph gave absolution to the emperor, the dispute was carried on between the "Arsenites" and the "Josephists." The "Arsenian schism" lasted till 1315, when a reconciliation was pronounced by the patriarch Nephon I. Arsenius is said to have prepared the decisions of the councils and the works of the Fathers a summary of divine laws under the title Synopsis Canonum. Some hold that Synopsis was the work of another Arsenios, a monk of Athos; the ascription depends on whether the patriarch Arsenios did or did not reside at Mount Athos.

References

Further reading
 Nicolas Oikonomidès, "Cinq actes inédits du patriarche Michel Autôreianos", Revue des études byzantines, 25 (1967), pp. 113–145

1200s births
1273 deaths
13th-century patriarchs of Constantinople
People from Constantinople
People of the Empire of Nicaea
Byzantine abbots
People associated with Mount Athos